Acraga ampela is a moth in the family Dalceridae. It was described by Herbert Druce in 1890. It has been collected in Ecuador, Peru and Colombia.

References

Moths described in 1890
Dalceridae